The 1913–14 Magyar Kupa (English: Hungarian Cup) was the 5th season of Hungary's annual knock-out cup football competition.

Final

See also
 1913–14 Nemzeti Bajnokság I

References

External links
 Official site 
 soccerway.com

1913–14 in Hungarian football
1913–14 domestic association football cups
1913-14